Harri Heliövaara (born 4 June 1989) is a Finnish tennis player. His highest ranking in singles is World No. 194, which he achieved on 19 December 2011. His highest ranking in doubles is world No. 9, which he achieved on 9 January 2023. In doubles he has won four ATP Tour titles, his first alongside Lloyd Glasspool at the 2021 Open 13, thirteen ATP Challenger tournaments, his first in 2011 in Tashkent, Uzbekistan. He has also won 20 ITF Futures in doubles and eight ITF Futures tournaments in singles. He won the 2007 Australian Open boys' doubles title with Graeme Dyce.

A quite unusual thing about his professional tennis career, is that he ended it in the middle of 2013, but decided to make a comeback four years later, in 2017.

Career

2021: First two titles, Wimbledon third round 
In March 2021, Heliövaara won his first ATP Tour title alongside Lloyd Glasspool at the 2021 Open 13 against Sander Arends and David Pel of the Netherlands and in October 2021, his second at the 2021 Kremlin Cup in Russia with Dutch Matwé Middelkoop.

2022: Two major quarterfinals & ATP Finals semifinal, ATP 500 title, top 15 
In 2022, Heliövaara reached two more ATP250 finals with Glasspool at the 2022 Open Sud de France in Lyon and the 2022 Dallas Open and entered the top 50 in doubles on 28 February 2022. In May 2022, on their debut at the 2022 Italian Open (tennis), the pair reached their first quarterfinal at a Masters 1000 as alternates, defeating top seeds, World No.1 Joe Salisbury and World No. 2 Rajeev Ram en route in the first round, marking their first win and a debut for Heliövaara at this level.

At the 2022 French Open he reached the quarterfinals of a Grand Slam for the first time in his career with Glasspool. As a result, he moved into the top 40 at World No. 39 on 6 June 2022.
The pair continued with their successful season reaching their first final on grass at the 2022 Queen's Club Championships. Next they advanced to the third round at Wimbledon for the second consecutive year.

They won the biggest title at the ATP 500 2022 Hamburg European Open defeating Matwé Middelkoop and Rohan Bopanna. As a result, Heliövaara reached the top 25 on 25 July 2022. At the 2022 Croatia Open Umag they reached the semifinals defeating wildcard pair Mili Poljičak and Nino Serdarušić. Next they defeated second seeds Rafael Matos and David Vega Hernández to reach their fifth final this season.

At the 2022 National Bank Open the pair reached the quarterfinals of a Masters 1000 for the second time in the season where they lost to third seeds Koolhof/Skupski.

Seeded 11th at the US Open they reached their second quarterfinal of a Grand Slam and first at this Major defeating 8th seeded pair of Kyrgios/Kokkinakis in three sets. The pair reached their sixth final of the season at the 2022 Moselle Open. As a result, Heliövaara reached the top 15 in the doubles rankings at World No. 14 on 26 September 2022.

On 4 November the pair qualified for their first 2022 ATP Finals after reaching their first Masters 1000 semifinal at the 2022 Rolex Paris Masters and Heliövaara moved to No. 12 in the rankings. They qualified for the ATP finals semifinals defeating Arévalo/Rojer and Granollers/Zeballos both matches in straight sets.

2023: Fourth ATP title, World No. 9 
He won his fourth title with his partner Glasspool in Adelaide and reached the top 10 at No. 9 on 9 January 2023. He also reached his eleventh final in Dubai with Glasspool.

Doubles performance timeline

Current through the 2023 Indian Wells Masters.

ATP career finals

Doubles: 11 (4 titles, 7 runner-ups)

ATP Challenger and ITF Futures finals

Singles: 13 (8–5)

Doubles: 58 (33–25)

Junior Grand Slam finals

Doubles: 1 (1 title)

References

External links
 
 
 Harri Heliövaara's official website 
 

Finnish male tennis players
Australian Open (tennis) junior champions
1989 births
Living people
Grand Slam (tennis) champions in boys' doubles
Sportspeople from Helsinki